Acid Factory is a 2009 Indian Hindi-language action thriller film directed by Suparn Verma under the banner of White Feather Films. The film released on 9 October 2009. The movie is a remake of 2006 Hollywood thriller Unknown.

Plot
Acid Factory is about a group of characters whose sense of past has vanished in a haze of coma like sleep they have woken up from only to discover that reality could be a figment of their imagination.

Their sense of right or wrong is clouded by this state of complete distrust and self-righteousness.

As the story reveals through the hazy mist of confusion confounded by loss off memory, the audience is just shown the tip of the iceberg. Five men wake up inside the stolid confines of a factory to find themselves locked in this claustrophobic nowhere land. As the plot unfolds, we gradually learn that two of the people who are trapped have been kidnapped and held hostage by the rest of the three for a heist. But the irony is they themselves do not know who the hostages are and who the kidnappers are. The plot is like a Rubik cube that acquires the contours of solid colours on each side as the narrative unfolds. Their fears are heightened by a phone call from Kaiser(Irrfan), the leader of the gang, who informs them that he is on his way with the ransom money and plans to knock off the two hostages as soon as he arrives. Every one fears for their lives as they are unaware about the fact which two of them are the hostages. They plan to escape, fail and end lunging at each other in despair as the clock ticks away. Individual foibles and shortcomings surface in this final hour of despair. Like caged animals, they alternately bicker among themselves and then jointly plan means of escape but to no avail.

Sarthak(Aftab) gets his memory back and realises he is a hostage and that JD(Dino) is the other hostage as both of them were kidnapped. He informs JD that both of them are going to be killed. JD however is skeptical because he has no memory of the events yet.

Meanwhile, Max(Dia) also recovers her memory and finds out she is Kaiser's girlfriend and that the other gang members are Om(Danny), Sultan(Manoj) and Romeo(Fardeen). Om also remembers everything. Just before Kaiser arrives in the factory, JD and Sultan also manage to remember everything, where it is revealed that JD and Sarthak were business partners and Sarthak was going to sell the company and JD wanted revenge hence the reason for Sarthak's kidnapping. It is also revealed that Kaiser does not like Romeo because he has an eye on Max.

The dreaded Kaiser gives Sarthak an opportunity to free himself by forcing him to kill JD. He then asks Sultan to kill Sarthak but makes an excuse to send Romeo to do the job. Romeo takes Sarthak outside to the balcony and fires in the air making the gang believe that Sarthak is dead. However, they figure that Romeo is in fact an undercover cop planted by the police and has not killed Sarthak. Eventually, there is a shootout in the factory where Sarthak finds 2 gas masks and gives one to Romeo. They fire at the pentane tank, causing an explosion similar to the one that caused everyone to lose their memory. This time, Romeo and Sarthak escape the factory to discover the cops waiting outside to arrest the gang. In the end, Romeo and Sarthak get back to their lives.

Cast
Fardeen Khan as Romeo, an undercover cop who infiltrates Kaiser's gang to bring it down
Irrfan Khan as Kaiser, The leader of the gang
Manoj Bajpayee as Sultan, one of Kaiser's accomplices 
Neha Bajpai as Nandini S. Sanghvi, Sarthak's wife
Dino Morea as J.D., a rich businessman, Sarthak's friend, later revealed to be one of Kaiser's accomplice 
Aftab Shivdasani as Sarthak, A rich business tycoon, JD's friend 
Danny Denzongpa as Om, one of Kaiser's accomplices 
Gulshan Grover as ACP Ranbir Singh, the assistant police commissioner who sends Romeo undercover 
Dia Mirza as Max, Kaiser's girl friend and accomplice

Music
The album has 9 tracks, composed by various composers such as Bappa Lahiri, Mansi Scott and Shamir Tandon.

"Kone Kone Mein" – Vasundhara Das
"Kone Kone Mein (Lounge Kilogram Mix)" – Vasundhara Das
"Nothing Else Will Do" – Ranjit Barot

Critical reception
Acid factory got positive reviews from the critics and was declared a semi-hit. Taran Adarsh (Bollywood Hungama) gave 3/5 and Rediff.com gave it 2/5 stars while PlanetBollywood and Glamsham.com give it 9/10 and 4/5 stars respectively.

References

External links
 
 

2000s Hindi-language films
2009 action thriller films
2009 films
Indian action thriller films
Films scored by Ranjit Barot
Films scored by Bappi Lahiri
Films scored by Shamir Tandon
Indian remakes of American films
Hindi-language action films